Asadabad-e Lateh Kuh (also Romanized as Āsadābād-e Lateh Kūh) is a village in Dadin Rural District, Jereh and Baladeh District, Kazerun County, Fars Province, Iran. At the 2006 census, its population was 21, in 6 families.

References 

Populated places in Kazerun County